The Women's 400-metre freestyle competition at the 2019 World Championships was held on 21 July 2019. Ariarne Titmus overcame a 0.62-second deficit in the last 50 metres to defeat defending champion Katie Ledecky. This was Ledecky's first loss in a major international 400 metre freestyle competition.

Records
Prior to the competition, the existing world and championship records were as follows.

Results

Heats
The heats were held at 11:22.

Final
The final was held at 20:33.

References

Women's 400 metre freestyle
2019 in women's swimming